Lost Valley may be:
Lost Valley (Antarctica)
Lost Valley Scout Reservation, a Boy Scouts of America camp in California
Lost Valley Ski Area, in Maine, United States
Lost Valley Educational Center, in Oregon, United States
"The Lost Valley of Iskander", a short story by Robert E. Howard, published in 1974
Lost Valley (Arkansas), a point near Arkansas Highway 74
Lost Valley (film), a 1997 New Zealand film
Coire Gabhail, the Lost Valley or Hidden Valley in Bidean nam Bian in Scotland